Khasais of Amir Al Momenin (Characters of the commander of the faithful) or Khasais-e-Ali is a book on virtues and moral characters of Imam Ali. The book was written by Ahmad Ibn Shoaeib Nisai (died 303 AH). He was concerned in the book with the place of Ali and his relation to Muhammad .

Author
He was born (215 AH) in Nisa, Turkmenistan,   located in Greater Khorasan in ancient times. Nesaei counted as one of the six confident narrators among Sunni in Islam religion. The book of Sunnah (Traditions) written by him, counted as one of the Sihah Settah (Six sources books) among Sunni. Zahabi says that: Nisai is more skillful than other narrators like Termadhi and Moslem.

Motive of writing
Nisai traveled to Damascus in the last years of his life. He saw there that Ali was abused, so he wrote the Khasa'is Ali, to remind people of the virtues of Ali ibn Abi Talib and his standing with the Prophet. This angered the Nasibis, who in return asked him to write a similar book about the virtues of Muawiya ibn Abi Sufyan. He refused, saying that there are no virtues reported about him (and this is the consensus among the scholars of hadith). But the Nasibis replied that there are narrations, so he replied "Only if you mean the Hadith "May Allah not fill his belly!" a hadith in which Muhammad cursed Muawiyah (note: a few Sunni scholars interpret this hadith as a blessing). This angered the Nasibis, so they beat him unconscious. He was transferred to Mecca, where he died reportedly because of the injuries of beatings.

Content
Nisai reported nearly 188 narrations on the character of Imam Ali. Some of the titles of books are as follows:
 Ali As First Muslim and Prayer
 Praying of Ali
 The relation between Ali and Allah
 Ali as most beloved creatures
 Ali As Vali for believers
 Ali is one of the members of the Household of the Holy prophet.

Translation
The book has been translated into the Persian, Indian, Azeri and Urdu languages. Some of them are as follows:
 Translation to Persian by Lahouri: "Haqaeq Ladonni in explaining about the features of Alavi Characters"
 Translation by Najjar Zadegan
Recently Muhammad Kazim Mahmoudi has improved the book by adding more Sunni references.

Publications
The book has been published by various publisher across the globe in different languages. The original book is in Arabic Language.
Khasais-e-Ali by Imam Nasai, Published by: Book corner (2016)
Khasais-E-Ali by Imam Nasai (Urdu Translation), Published by: Darussalam (2007)

References

Khasais-e-Ali by Imam Nasai (Urdu translation)
by Imam Nasai
https://archive.org/details/Khasais-e-aliByImamNasaiurduTranslation
Usage Attribution-Noncommercial-No Derivative Works 3.0Creative Commons Licensebyncnd
Topics Arabic, Urdu, Ali, Nasai, Hadith
Collection opensource
Language Urdu
Merits of Sayyidina Imam Ali in the Sahih Ahadith, by the great Imam of Hadith Imam Nasai, author of Sunan Nasai
Author: Imam Nasai
Translator: Saaim Chishti
Addeddate 2012-02-12 17:23:58
Identifier Khasais-e-aliByImamNasaiurduTranslation
Identifier-ark ark:/13960/t3709490w
Ocr language not currently OCRable
Page-progression rl
Ppi 600

External links
 http://www.wilayat.net/index.php/en/projects/44-khasais-e-ali-authentication-project/160-introduction-to-khasais-e-ali

Sunni hadith collections
Sunni literature
Works about Ali